Flavius Sabinianus (floruit 505–508) was a politician and a general of the Eastern Roman Empire.

Life 

Sabinian was the son of Sabinianus Magnus, a magister militum per Illyricum (479–481). He married a niece of emperor Anastasius I and was the father of Anastasius Paulus Probus Sabinianus Pompeius Anastasius, consul in 517.

In 505 he held the consulship, while in 508 he was appointed magister militum per Illyricum. He had a big and well-equipped army, but near Horreum Margi he was defeated by the combined armies of the Huns, led by Mundo, and of the Ostrogoths, led by Pitzias. After the defeat, he went with a few survivors to the fortress of Natus.

Bibliography 
 Croke, Brian, Count Marcellinus and His Chronicle,  Oxford University Press, 2001, p. 89.
 Martindale, John R., Prosopography of the Later Roman Empire, vol. II, Cambridge University Press, 1992, pp. 967–968.

6th-century deaths
5th-century Byzantine people
6th-century Byzantine people
6th-century Roman consuls
Byzantine generals
Imperial Roman consuls
Magistri militum
Year of birth unknown
Year of death unknown